In demonology, Valefar (also Valefor, Malaphar, Malephar, Valafar) is a Duke of Hell. He tempts people to steal and is in charge of a good relationship among thieves. Valefar is considered a good familiar by his associates "till they are caught in the trap". He commands ten legions of demons.

He is represented as a lion with the head of a man, or as a lion with the head of a donkey.

See also

 The Lesser Key of Solomon

References

Sources
 S. L. MacGregor Mathers, A. Crowley, The Goetia: The Lesser Key of Solomon the King (1904). 1995 reprint: .

Goetic demons